Ayberk is a common masculine Turkish given name. It is composed of "Ay" and "Berk". In Turkish, "Ay" means "Moon". "Berk" means "Lightning", "Strong", or "Leaf" (rarely). Therefore, "Ayberk" means "Lightning like brightness of the moon".

Real People
 Ayberk Sevinç, Turkish volleyball player who currently plays Fenerbahçe Men's Volleyball.
 Ayberk Köprülü, TV host and producer (See Dutch Wikipedia article).

Turkish masculine given names